Delito is a 1962 Argentine film.

Plot

Cast
Élida Gay Palmer
Claude Marting
Luis Tasca
Víctor Tasca
Periodista
Floren Delbene
Homero Cárpena
Eduardo Bergara Leumann

External links
 
 Rate Your Music

1962 films
1960s Spanish-language films
Argentine black-and-white films
Films directed by Ralph Pappier
1960s Argentine films